The Women's 50 metre freestyle competition at the 2017 World Championships was held on 29 and 30 July 2017.

Records
Prior to the competition, the existing world and championship records were as follows.

The following new records were set during this competition.

Results

Heats
The heats were held on 29 July at 09:30.

Semifinals
The semifinals were held on 29 July at 18:28.

Semifinal 1

Semifinal 2

Final
The final was held on 30 July at 17:50.

References

Women's 50 metre freestyle
2017 in women's swimming